Georges Eekhoud (27 May 1854 – 29 May 1927) was a Belgian novelist of Flemish descent, but writing in French.

Eekhoud was a regionalist best known for his ability to represent scenes from rural and urban daily life.  He tended to portray the dark side of human desire and write about social outcasts and the working classes.

Early life and works
Eekhoud was born in Antwerp. A member of a fairly well-off family, he lost his parents as a young boy. When he came into his own he started working for a journal. First as a corrector, later he contributed a serial. In 1877, the generosity of his grandmother permitted young Eekhoud to publish his first two books, Myrtes et Cyprès and Zigzags poétiques, both volumes of poetry. In the beginning of the 1880s Eekhoud took part in several of the modern French-Belgian artist movements, like Les XX (The Twenty) and La Jeune Belgique (Young Belgium). Kees Doorik, his first novel was published in 1883,   about the wild life of a tough young farmhand who committed a murder. The renowned free-thinking publisher Henri Kistemaeckers brought out a second edition three years later. Eekhoud received some guarded praise by famous authors like Edmond de Goncourt and Joris-Karl Huysmans who both sent Eekhoud a personal letter. For his second prose book, Kermesses (Fairs, 1884), not only Goncourt and Huysmans praised him, but also Émile Zola, about whom Eekhoud had written an essay in 1879.

In 1886 his novel Les milices de Saint-François (The Soldiers of Saint Francis Xavier) was published. By now Eekhoud's established subject was the rural Campine, a poor farmers' district east of Antwerp. He had a distinct style permeated with enthusiasm for the roguish young farm labourers and their rough-and-tumble lives. His most famous novel, La nouvelle Carthage  (The New Carthage) was published in its definitive form in 1893, and many times reprinted. It has also been translated in English, German, Dutch, Russian, Romanian and Czech. The rustic Campine was in this book replaced with the brutal life of love and death in the Antwerp dockland metropolis and its dirty industry.

Escal-Vigor
In 1899 Eekhoud offered to his readers a new and daring novel, Escal-Vigor. This is the name of the castle of its protagonist, count Henry de Kehlmark, but it conveys the name 'Escaut', French for the river Scheldt, and 'Vigor', Latin for Power. Many of these readers were shocked, because the book is concerned with love between men. According to Eekhoud's biographer Mirande Lucien, Escal-Vigor was the book of a man who wanted to speak about himself in all freedom. Escal-Vigor is a homogeneous, linear text. The story goes without detours to its final scene of the martyrdom, the moment that the tortured bodies testify of the justness of their cause. As for its composition, Escal-Vigor is the least decadent of Eekhoud's works. Eekhoud makes much less use of the elaborate and old-fashioned words that make the reader stop and wonder.

A clear and resolute novel about homosexuality, Escal-Vigor was heading towards trouble. Although it was well received by most critics, like Rachilde and Eugène Demolder, a lawsuit was launched against it. However, a storm of protest, especially vociferous because of numerous literary celebrities, and a cunning lawyer with literary aspirations, Edmond Picard, did their part in acquitting Eekhoud.

Eekhoud's later years
Later novels and stories, like L'Autre Vue (1904) and Les Libertins d'Anvers ( Antwerp libertines, 1912) also contain notions of homosexuality or sometimes only hints of admiration for masculinity, e.g. Dernières Kermesses (1920). Eekhoud corresponded with Jacques d'Adelswärd-Fersen and contributed to his sumptuous literary monthly Akademos (1909). Also, he influenced young Jacob Israël de Haan, who authored several poems on themes of his older Belgian colleague, especially La Nouvelle Carthage and Les Libertines d'Anvers. Eekhoud for his part wrote the preface of De Haan's sadomasochist novel Pathologieën (Pathologies, 1908). The two authors kept in contact by letter.

Eekhoud continued to be a well-respected author until he put on a firmly pacifistic stance in World War I that ravaged Belgium, after which his star declined. In the twenties his books started to be reprinted again, although he died in 1927 at Schaerbeek.

Eekhoud left a voluminous diary (1895–1927) of some 5000 pages, that has been bought by the Royal Library of Brussels in 1982. Various Belgian libraries contain extensive collections of correspondence.

Modern interest
Nowadays, especially the homosexual aspect of his works has enjoyed attention. Escal-Vigor has been reprinted in 1982, and Eekhoud's partly homoerotic correspondence with the journalist Sander Pierron was published ten years later. This book, a full-scale biography and a choice of his works were edited by Mirande Lucien.

Works

 Myrtes et Cyprès (poetry, 1877)
 Zigzags poétiques (poetry, 1877)
 Kees Doorik (novel, 1883)
 Kermesses (1884)
 Les Milices de Saint-François. (novel, 1886)
 Nouvelles Kermesses.
 La Nouvelle Carthage. (novel, 1888)
 Les Fusillés de Malines.
 Au Siècle de Shakespeare.
 Mes Communions.
 Philaster (tragédie de Beaumont et Fletcher).
 La Duchesse de Malfi (tragédie de John Webster).
 Edouard II (tragédie de Christopher Marlowe).
 Le Cycle Patibulaire (2nd edition 1896)
 Escal-vigor (1899)
 La faneuse d'amour (novel, 2nd edition 1900)
 L'Autre Vue (1904)
 Les Libertins d'Anvers (1912)
 Dernières Kermesses (1920)
 Mon bien aimé petit Sander: Lettres de Georges Eekhoud à Sander Pierron, suivies de six lettres de Sander Pierron à Georges Eekhoud (1993).

See also
 LGBT writers in the Dutch-language area

References

Sources
 Jacob Israël de Haan: Nerveuze Vertellingen with an introduction by Rob Delvigne and Leo Ross. Bert Bakker (1983)
 Georges Eekhoud: Mon bien aimé petit Sander, suivies de six lettres de Sander Pierron à Georges Eekhoud. Lettres de Georges Eekhoud à Sander Pierron (= My much beloved little Sander). Lille, GKC, 1993.
 Mirande Lucien: Eekhoud le rauque (= Eekhoud the hoarse). Villeneuve d'Ascq, Septentrion, 1999.

External links

 
 
 

1854 births
1927 deaths
19th-century Belgian novelists
19th-century Belgian male writers
Belgian male novelists
Belgian writers in French
Gay novelists
Writers from Antwerp
Belgian gay writers
Belgian LGBT novelists
20th-century Belgian novelists
Belgian male short story writers
Belgian short story writers
20th-century short story writers
Members of the Académie royale de langue et de littérature françaises de Belgique
20th-century Belgian male writers